In algebraic geometry, Brill–Noether theory, introduced by , is the study of special divisors, certain divisors on a curve  that determine more compatible functions than would be predicted. In classical language, special divisors move on the curve in a "larger than expected" linear system of divisors.

Throughout, we consider a projective smooth curve over the complex numbers (or over some other algebraically closed field).

This means that, by the Riemann–Roch theorem, the  cohomology or space of holomorphic sections is larger than expected.

Alternatively, by Serre duality, the condition is that there exist holomorphic differentials with divisor  on the curve.

Main theorems of Brill–Noether theory

For a given genus , the moduli space for curves  of genus  should contain a dense subset parameterizing those curves with the minimum in the way of special divisors.

There is a lower bound  for the dimension  of this subscheme in :

called the Brill–Noether number. 
 George Kempf proved that if  then  is not empty, and every component has dimension at least .
 William Fulton and Robert Lazarsfeld proved that if  then   is connected.
 showed  that if  is generic then  is reduced and all components have dimension exactly  (so in particular  is empty if ).
 David Gieseker proved that if  is generic then  is smooth. By the connectedness result this implies it is irreducible if .
Other more recent results not necessarily in terms of space   of linear systems are:

 Eric Larson and Isabel Vogt (2022) proved that if  then there is a curve  interpolating through  general points in  if and only if  except in 4 exceptional cases:

References

Notes 

Algebraic curves
Algebraic surfaces